The Belko Experiment is a 2016 American horror film directed by Greg McLean and written by James Gunn, who also produced the film with Peter Safran. It stars John Gallagher Jr., Tony Goldwyn, Adria Arjona, John C. McGinley, Melonie Diaz, Josh Brener, and Michael Rooker. The film follows eighty Americans working abroad for a company named Belko Industries in Bogotá, Colombia. One day after they arrive at work, they are locked inside the building, and a mysterious voice announces that they have to start killing each other or else.

Filming began on June 1, 2015, in Bogotá, Colombia, and concluded the following month. The film premiered at the Toronto International Film Festival on September 10, 2016, and was released in the United States on March 17, 2017, by Blumhouse Tilt and Orion Pictures. The film received mixed reviews from critics and has grossed $11 million worldwide against its $5 million budget.

Plot
Mike Milch, an employee of Belko Industries, while driving to work is stopped by street vendors selling "lucky" handmade dolls. Barry Norris, also of Belko Industries, arrives at the office building in Bogotá, Colombia, to find unfamiliar security guards turning away the local Colombian staff at the gate. New employee Dany Wilkins reports for her first day on the job and is told that a tracking device is implanted in the base of every Belko employee's skull in case something happens to them.

Evan Smith, Belko's head security guard, does not know who the new security guards are. Once all the employees show up, a voice on the intercom instructs them to kill two of their co-workers, or else there will be consequences. Several staff attempt to flee the building, but steel shutters seal off the walls and doors, locking them all in. They ignore the announcement at first, believing it to be a sick prank, but after the set time ends and the two have not been killed, four employees die when explosives hidden in their trackers detonate and blow their heads apart. Mike attempts to remove his tracker with a box cutter, but gives up when the voice threatens to detonate his tracker explosive unless he stops.

The group is told that unless thirty of them are dead within two hours, sixty will be killed. They split into two factions, one led by Mike, who believes that there should be no killing, and one led by Barry, who intends to follow the directions in order to save himself. Barry and his group, consisting of executive Wendell, as well as employees Terry, Antonio, and Bradley attempt to burn off the lock of the armory in order to gain access to its weapons. Mike and his group, including his girlfriend, Leandra Florez, Evan and employees Keith, Leota, Peggy, Vince and Roberto, try to hang banners from the roof as a call for help, but soldiers outside shoot at them. Barry, Wendell, and Terry ambush the group in the stairway, kill Evan and take his keys to the armory.

With his group now armed, Barry and Wendell select thirty people, including Mike and Peggy, forcing them to kneel in a line. Barry begins executing them with a gunshot to the back of the head. Dany, who has been hiding in the basement, sees what is happening and shuts off the building's lights before Mike and several others can be killed. The employees immediately run for cover as Barry and his group start firing, killing several more people. However, Bradley and Antonio are ganged upon and killed by the employees. During this, Dany goes into the elevator shaft with Roberto.

Barry and Wendell hunt down the fleeing employees as the voice informs them that only twenty-nine have been killed. Then the two-hour time limit runs out. The voice states that 31 more people will die, including Terry, Leota, Peggy, and Keith, leaving only 16 survivors. They are then informed by the voice that, as a final task, the employee who has killed the most people within an hour will be spared. Barry finds Dany and Roberto in the elevator shaft. Dany escapes while Roberto is crushed and killed in the elevator shaft. Leandra finds two employees, Marty and Chet, collecting the un-exploded trackers from the heads of people who have died by other methods. They tell her that they are planning to use them to blow up the wall. However, they are killed by Wendell. Leandra kills Wendell, leaving the final six survivors: Vince, Mike, Barry, Dany, Leandra, and cafeteria lady Liezle, who is killed shortly afterward. Barry shoots Vince and Dany, killing them, and also shoots Leandra. With her dying breath, she proclaims her love to Mike.

In a rage, Mike has a brutal fight with Barry, in which Barry gets the better of him at first, however, Mike fends Barry off using a tape dispenser, which ends in Mike bludgeoning Barry to death. The building is then unsealed, as he is the last survivor, and the soldiers escort him to the hangar next door. There, he meets the owner of the Voice, who says that they're part of an international organization studying human behaviour. As he and his colleagues begin to question Mike about his emotional and mental state, Mike notices a panel of switches that correspond to the eighty employees. Having planted the trackers that Marty collected on the soldiers and the Voice, he flips every remaining active switch except his own. The trackers explode, killing the soldiers and wounding the Voice, before Mike grabs a gun and kills the remaining scientists. The Voice attempts to reason with Mike and appeal to his moral beliefs, but Mike kills him. He then leaves the warehouse in a state of shock. 

It becomes apparent that Mike is one of many sole survivors from similar experiments, being watched by another group through security cameras. A new voice states, "End stage one, commence stage two."

Cast

John Gallagher Jr. as Mike Milch, an employee at Belko Industries
Tony Goldwyn as Barry Norris, the COO of Belko and an ex-special forces soldier
Adria Arjona as Leandra Florez, Norris' assistant and Mike's love interest
John C. McGinley as Wendell Dukes, a socially awkward top executive
Melonie Diaz as Dany Wilkins, a new hire at Belko
Owain Yeoman as Terry Winters, Mike's co-worker and friend.
Sean Gunn as Marty Espenscheid, a cafeteria worker
Brent Sexton as Vince Agostino, Belko's head of human resources
Josh Brener as Keith McLure, a tech worker
David Dastmalchian as Alonso "Lonny" Crane, a maintenance worker under Melks
David Del Rio as Roberto Jerez, a worker who befriends Dany.
Gregg Henry as The Voice
Michael Rooker as Bud Melks, Belko's head of Maintenance
Rusty Schwimmer as Peggy Displasia, Milch's secretary
Gail Bean as Leota Hynek, a worker who befriends Wilkins
James Earl as Evan Smith, Belko's only security guard
Abraham Benrubi as Chet Valincourt, Espencheid's best friend
Valentine Miele as Ross Reynolds, a sales representative for Belko
Stephen Blackehart as Robert Hickland, an interpreter
Benjamin Byron Davis as Antonio Fowler, a worker.
Silvia de Dios as Helena Barton, the supervisor of Roberto, Leota, Bradley and Dany
Cindy Better as Lorena Checo, a worker who pretends to be friendly to Norris.
Andres Suarez as Bradley Lang, Dany's co-worker
Alietta Montero as Liezle Freemont, a cafeteria worker.
Joe Fria as Tyson Moon, Wendell's friend.
Mikaela Hoover as Raziya Memarian, Agostino's assistant
Maia Landaburu as Louisa "Raven" Luna, a worker.
Santiago Bejarano as Luis Costa, an elderly worker.
Maruia Shelton as Agnes Meraz, a co-worker of Luigi.
Luna Baxter as Samantha Arcos, a co-worker of Mike.
Maria Juliana Caicedo as Lucy Martinez, a friend of Chet and Marty.
Kristina Lilley as Sarah Mariana, a worker. She is the last person to arrive before the experiment begins.
Juan Ortega as Luigi Moretti, a co-worker of Agnes.
Yeison Alvarez as Lawrence Fitzgibbon, Evan's best friend.
Silvia Varón as Frances Anne, the only wheelchair-using employee of Belko.
Lorena Tobar as J. Ferguson, an elderly cafeteria worker.
Ximena Rodriguez as A. Huberman, a cafeteria worker.
Álvaro García as Jonathan Schwartz, an elderly worker.

Production
James Gunn began writing the film around 2007, after waking up from a dream of an office building being enclosed in metal walls and hearing a voice instruct employees to kill each other. The film was greenlit soon thereafter, and plans were made for it to be filmed in São Paulo, Brazil, with Gunn directing. However, Gunn turned down the opportunity, owing to getting a divorce around the same time. Gunn later said, "I just wanted to be around my friends and family. I didn't want to go shoot this thing that was about people who loved and cared about each other being forced into killing each other. It just didn't seem to be the way I wanted to spend the next few months of my life. So I backed out of it." Gunn moved on to other projects, including the 2010 film Super, and had "kind of forgotten about it" until he received a call from Jon Glickman at MGM asking if he would still be interested in making it. Gunn did not have time to direct the film himself, due to his work on Guardians of the Galaxy, but he agreed to produce it, provided that he was given full creative control.

Much of the cast was announced in May 2015, including John Gallagher Jr., Tony Goldwyn, and Melonie Diaz.  More joined the cast in June, including David Del Rio, Stephen Blackehart, Josh Brener, and Rusty Schwimmer. Principal photography on the film began on June 1, 2015, in Bogotá, Colombia. and concluded on July 12, 2015.

Release
The film had its world premiere at the Toronto International Film Festival on September 10, 2016. Shortly after, Blumhouse Tilt and Orion Pictures acquired U.S distribution rights to the film, and set it for a March 17, 2017, release. It was released to UK theaters on April 15, 2017.

The film was promoted through a series of four claymation shorts directed by Lee Hardcastle which, according to website io9 (where they debuted),  "features exaggerated versions of The Belko Experiment’s characters, and offers a taste of the level of violence and humor you’ll see when the actual movie opens". The movie was also promoted with a video game, "'Belko Experiment’ Escape Room in VR" released for virtual reality platforms.

Reception

Box office
In the United States and Canada, The Belko Experiment was released alongside Beauty and the Beast and was projected to gross around $4 million in its opening weekend. It made $305,000 from Thursday night previews and $1.5 million on its first day. It went on to open to $4.1 million, finishing seventh at the box office.

Critical response
According to the review aggregator website Rotten Tomatoes, 54% of critics have given the film a positive review based on 106 reviews and an average rating of 5.6/10. The site's critics consensus reads, "The Belko Experiment offers a few moments of lurid fun for genre enthusiasts, but lacks enough subversive smarts to consistently engage once the carnage kicks in." On Metacritic, the film has a score 44 out of 100 based on 21 critics, indicating "mixed or average reviews".

See also 

 Mean Guns, a 1997 film with a similar plot device
 The Tournament, a 2009 film with a similar plot device
 Mayhem, a 2017 film with a similar premise
 Office Uprising, a 2018 film with a similar premise

References

External links
 
 
 

2016 films
2016 horror films
American horror thriller films
American psychological horror films
American psychological thriller films
American splatter films
2010s psychological horror films
2016 psychological thriller films
2016 horror thriller films
Films directed by Greg McLean
Films set in Colombia
Films set in offices
Films shot in Colombia
Blumhouse Productions films
Orion Pictures films
Metro-Goldwyn-Mayer films
Films with screenplays by James Gunn
Films about death games
Films produced by James Gunn
Films scored by Tyler Bates
2010s English-language films
2010s American films